Meiningen is a town in the southern part of the state of Thuringia, Germany.

Meiningen may also refer to:
 Meiningen, Austria, a municipality in the district of Feldkirch in the Austrian state of Vorarlberg
 Meiningen Court Orchestra, one of the oldest and most traditional orchestras in Europe, associated with the Meiningen Court Theatre
 Meiningen Court Theatre, Thuringia, a building
 Meiningen Ensemble or Company, the court theatre of the former German duchy of Saxe-Meiningen
 Meiningen station, a railway station in Thuringia
 Meiningen Steam Locomotive Works, Thuringia

See also
 Amtsgericht Meiningen, a district court in Thuringia
 Saxe-Meiningen, a former duchy in Thuringia
 Schmalkalden-Meiningen, a Landkreis in the southwest of Thuringia
 Schweinfurt–Meiningen railway, a single-tracked line in the German states of Bavaria and Saxony